A war economy or wartime economy is the set of contingencies undertaken by a modern state to mobilize its economy for war production. Philippe Le Billon describes a war economy as a "system of producing, mobilizing and allocating resources to sustain the violence." Some measures taken include the increasing of Taylor rates as well as the introduction of resource allocation programs. Approaches to the reconfiguration of the economy differ from country to country.

Many states increase the degree of planning in their economies during wars; in many cases this extends to rationing, and in some cases to conscription for civil defenses, such as the Women's Land Army and Bevin Boys in the United Kingdom during World War II. During total war situations, certain buildings and positions are often seen as important targets by combatants. The Union blockade, Union General William Tecumseh Sherman's March to the Sea during the American Civil War, and the strategic bombing of enemy cities and factories during World War II are all examples of total war.

Concerning the side of aggregate demand, the concept of a war economy has been linked to the concept of "military Keynesianism", in which the government's military budget stabilizes business cycles and fluctuations and/or is used to fight recessions. On the supply side, it has been observed that wars sometimes have the effect of accelerating technological progress to such an extent that an economy is greatly strengthened after the war, especially if it has avoided the war-related destruction. This was the case, for example, with the United States in World War I and World War II. Some economists (such as Seymour Melman) argue, however, that the wasteful nature of much of military spending eventually can hurt technological progress.

War is often used as a last ditch effort to prevent deteriorating economic conditions or currency crises, particularly by expanding services and employment in the military, and by simultaneously depopulating segments of the population to free up resources and restore the economic and social order. A temporary war economy can also be seen as a means to avoid the need for more permanent militarization. During World War II, U.S. President Franklin D. Roosevelt stated that if the Axis powers won, then "we would have to convert ourselves permanently into a militaristic power on the basis of war economy."

United States 

The United States has a very complex history with wartime economies. Many notable instances came during the twentieth century in which America's main conflicts consisted of the World Wars, the Korean War, and the Vietnam War.

World War I 

In mobilizing for World War I, the United States expanded its governmental powers by creating institutions such as the War Industries Board (WIB) to help with military production. Others, such as the Fuel Administration, introduced daylight saving time in an effort to save coal and oil while the Food Administration encouraged higher grain production and "mobilized a spirit of self-sacrifice rather than mandatory rationing." Propaganda also played a large part in garnering support for topics ranging from tax initiatives to food conservation. Speaking on Four Minute Men, volunteers who rallied the public through short speeches, investigative journalist George Creel stated that the idea was extremely popular and the program saw thousands of volunteers throughout the states.

World War II

In the case of the Second World War, the U.S. government took similar measures in increasing its control over the economy. The Fall of France and the shifting of the front line into the English Channel with the outcome of the looming Battle of Britain uncertain provided the spark needed to begin conversion to a wartime economy with the passing of the Two-Ocean Navy Act in July 1940. The subsequent Attack on Pearl Harbor prolonged and expanded the measures. The Washington felt that a greater bureaucracy was needed to help with mobilization. The government raised taxes which paid for half of the war's costs and borrowed money in the form of war bonds to cover the rest of the bill. "Commercial institutions like banks also bought billions of dollars of bonds and other treasury paper, holding more than $24 billion at the war's end." The creation of a handful of agencies helped funnel resources towards the war effort. One prominent agency was the War Production Board (WPB), which "awarded defense contracts, allocated scarce resources – such as rubber, copper, and oil – for military uses, and persuaded businesses to convert to military production."

The United States mass-produced many vehicles, such as ships (i.e. Liberty Ships), aircraft (i.e. North American P-51 Mustang), jeeps (i.e. Willys MB) and tanks (i.e. M4 Sherman).

Two-thirds of the American economy had been integrated into the war effort by the end of 1943. Because of this massive cooperation between government and private entities, it could be argued that the economic measures enacted prior to and during the Second World War helped lead the Allies to victory.

Present day
The United States has been involved in numerous military endeavours within the Middle East and Latin America since the 1960s. Having been in a continuous state of war since the September 11 attacks, they have an annual military budget larger than India, China, Russia, United Kingdom, Germany, Saudi Arabia, and France’s military budgets combined.

Germany

World War I 

Germany has experienced economic devastation following both World Wars. While this was not a result of faulty economic planning, it is important to understand the ways that Germany approached reconstruction. In World War I, the German agricultural sector was hit hard by the demands of the war effort. Not only were many of the workers conscripted, but much of the food itself was allocated for the troops leading to a shortage. "German authorities were not able to solve the food scarcity [problem], but implemented a food rationing system and several price ceilings to prevent speculation and profiteering. Unfortunately, these measures did not have the desired success."

World War II 

Heading into the Second World War, the Nazis introduced new policies that not only caused the unemployment rate to drop, it created a competent war machine in clear violation of the Treaty of Versailles. The Third Reich implemented a draft and built factories to supply its quickly expanding military. Both of these actions created jobs for many Germans who had been struggling from the economic collapse following World War I. However, it is worth noting that while unemployment rates plummeted, "by 1939, government debt stood at over 40 billion Reichsmarks (equivalent to  billion  euros)." After World War II, Germany was discovered to have exploited the economies of the countries it invaded. The most important among these, according to historians Boldorf and Scherner, was France and "her highly developed economy... [being] one of the biggest in Europe." This is further supported when they later reveal how the French economy provided for 11 percent of Germany's national income (during the occupation) which covered five months of Germany's total income for the war. Using extortion and forced labor, the Nazis siphoned off much of France's economic output. For example, during the early months of the Nazi occupation, the French puppet government was forced to pay a "quartering" fee of twenty million Reichsmarks per day. Supposedly, the fee was payment for the Nazi occupation forces. In reality, the money was used to fuel the Nazi war economy. Germany employed numerous methods to support its war effort. However, due to the Nazis' surrender to the Allies, it is hard to tell what their economic policies would have yielded in the long term.

Other Examples 
Armenia is another example that followed war economy principles, especially during the 2020 Nagorno-Karabakh war. Armenia is a small country in a blockade in the Caucasus region but still increased its military budget after 2018 reaching $640 million. In 2019 it was 18.8% of the total Armenian budget. Except mobilizing financial resources, Armenia also declared mobilization and concentrated human capital (volunteers, doctors, soldiers).

See also
 Companies by arms sales
 Defense Economics
 Diversionary war
 Economic warfare
 Industrial warfare
 Military–industrial complex
 Mass production
 Permanent war economy
 Resistance economy
 The Climate Mobilization: calls for a WWII–scale economic transformation to combat climate change
 Total war
 War communism
 War effort
 World War Zero
 Wartime propaganda
 War cabinet
 Victory garden

Further reading
Moeller, Susan. (1999). "Compassion Fatigue", Compassion Fatigue: How the Media Sells Disease, Famine, War and Death. New York & London: Routledge. 6 - 53.
Goldstein, Joshua S. (2001). War and gender: How gender shapes the war system and vice versa. Cambridge: Cambridge University Press.
 Le Billon, Dr. Philippe (2005) Geopolitics of Resource Wars: Resource Dependence, Governance and Violence. London: Frank Cass, 288pp
 Gagliano Giuseppe, Economic War, Modern Diplomacy, 2017,
 Climate Change is not World War

References

Economic planning
Military economics
Economic warfare